The 2016–17 Sydney Sixers WBBL season was the second in the team's history. Coached by Ben Sawyer and captained by Ellyse Perry, the team competed in the WBBL02 tournament.

At the conclusion of the group stage, the Sixers team was at the top of the table.  The Sixers then defeated the Hobart Hurricanes in a semi-final, and the Perth Scorchers in the final, to emerge as the WBBL|02 champions.

Squad
The following is the Sixers women squad for WBBL|02.  Players with international caps are listed in bold.

Sources

Ladder

Fixtures

Group stage

Knockout phase

Semi-final

Final

References

2016–17 Women's Big Bash League season by team
Sydney Sixers (WBBL)